Cundinamarca Department was one of the departments of Gran Colombia. It was part of the Centro District.

Provinces 
 Bogotá Province. Capital: Bogotá. Cantones: Bogotá, Funza, Guaduas, Mesa, Tocaima, Ubaté y Zipaquirá.
 Antioquia Province. Capital: Santa Fe de Antioquia. Cantones: Antioquia, Cáceres, Medellín, Rionegro, Santa Rosa, Santo Domingo y Zaragoza.
 Mariquita Province. Capital: Mariquita. Cantones: Mariquita, Honda, Ibagué y La Palma.
 Neiva Province. Capital: Neiva. Cantones: Neiva, La Plata, Purificación y Timaná.

See also 
 Cundinamarca Department (1820)
 Cundinamarca Department

References

Departments of Gran Colombia
1824 establishments in Gran Colombia